Akpe: Return of the Beast, is a 2019 Nigerian action drama film directed by Toka McBaror and produced by Justice Nuagbe. The film stars Jide Kosoko in the lead role whereas Juliet Ibrahim, Bolanle Ninalowo, Daniel Lloyd and Eniola Badmus made supportive roles. The film rotates around Akpe, a self-proclaimed king of the Zanga where his closest friend organizes a group of boys to conquer the street.

The film made its premier on 27 October 2019.

Cast
 Jide Kosoko as Akpe
 Juliet Ibrahim
 Bolanle Ninalowo
 Daniel Lloyd
 Eniola Badmus
 Mr. Jollof

References 

English-language Nigerian films
2019 films
2019 drama films
2010s English-language films